Živorad (Cyrillic script: Живорад) is a Serbian masculine given name of Slavic origin. The name may refer to:

Živorad Jevtić (born 1943), footballer
Živorad Kovačević (1930–2011), politician
Živorad Mišić (born 1986), footballer
Živorad Smiljanić (born 1942), Serbian politician
Živorad Tomić (born 1951), film director
Žikica Jovanović Španac Yugoslav partisan

Slavic masculine given names
Serbian masculine given names